Enrique Omar Sívori (2 October 1935 – 17 February 2005) was an Italian-Argentine football player and manager who played as a forward. At club level, he is known for his successful time with Italian side Juventus during the late 1950s and early 1960s, where he won three Serie A titles among other trophies; he also played for River Plate in Argentina and Napoli in Italy.

He made his international debut for Argentina, winning the 1957 South American Championship. Later in his career, he represented Italy and took part in some of the 1962 World Cup. After his retirement as player, he coached several teams in Argentina.

Regarded as one of the greatest players of his generation and as one of the greatest football players of all time, Sívori was known for his outstanding skill, speed, goalscoring ability, technique, creativity, and his footballing talent was widely acclaimed. He won the South American Championship Best Player award in 1957, and the coveted European Footballer of the Year award in 1961. Sivori scored 432 goals in his career, including friendlies.

Club career

River Plate

Sívori was born in San Nicolás de los Arroyos, a town which falls within the Buenos Aires Province, in an Italian Argentine family. His paternal grandfather, Giulio Sivori, was an immigrant from Cavi di Lavagna, a hamlet in the province of Genoa, while his mother Carolina was of Abruzzese descent. As a youngster Sívori became heavily interested in the game of football and by the time he reached his teens he was signed up to a side from the city of Buenos Aires, River Plate. The teenage Sívori was given a chance to break through into a squad which included players like the famed forwards Ángel Labruna and Félix Loustau who established themselves in the era of La Máquina, one of the foremost formations in football history. He soon earned the nickname El Cabezón (bighead) from the fans, due to his hair, outspokenness, confidence, arrogance, and playing style.

River was able to win the Argentine Primera División in 1955, the title was confirmed when River beat local archrival Boca Juniors 2–1 at La Bombonera, in Buenos Aires, with just one game remaining. The same season River won the Copa Río de La Plata by beating Nacional from Uruguay. The following season he had similar success when River won the Argentine league title on the final day of the season; beating Rosario Central 4–0, with Sívori scoring the final goal. Sívori would play his final game for River against the same team on 5 May 1957.

During the 1957–58 season, the 21-year-old Sívori was signed by Italian club Juventus after being spotted by Renato Cesarini. Juventus paid 10 million pesos (the equivalent of £91,000) for the transfer, which was a world-record transfer fee for the time. Sívori's move would prove bad for River's league fortunes, in the 18 years after 1957 they were unable to win the league in Argentina. However, they were able to complete their El Monumental stadium (previously nicknamed "the horseshoe") by adding a fourth stand bearing his name, with the money from the deal.

Juventus
The same season two other prominent Argentines moved to the Italian league: Antonio Valentín Angelillo (Inter) and Humberto Maschio (Bologna). The three had all been part of Argentina's defenders that brought home gold from the 1957 South American Championship. With an emphasis on the forward line positions, the team was nicknamed The Angels with Dirty Faces,  a reference to cinema's then-celebrated Angels with Dirty Faces–the team's irreverent style of play and lackadaisical attitude to training. The nickname followed the trio after the tournament and their move to Italy. In Italy, the trio were nicknamed The Trio of Death, the trio's clinical ability in scoring goals.

Prior to the arrival of Sívori and Welshman John Charles, Juventus had been going through somewhat of a slump. However, the duo along with experienced Juventino Giampiero Boniperti put together a formidable force and won Serie A during the 1957–58 season. Their good form continued and Sívori won two more scudetti (1959–60 and 1960–61) as well as two Coppa Italia titles (1958–59 and 1959–60), and the Coppa delle Alpi (1963). Omar Sívori's hard work had paid off and he was named European Footballer of the Year (also known as Ballon d'or) in 1961.

The same year as his personal achievement however, the Magical Trio as they were known, had broken up with Boniperti's retirement and the following season John Charles moved back to Leeds United. Sívori stayed on with the Old Lady, notably scoring the only goal in a 1–0 victory against Real Madrid, making Juventus the first Italian side ever to win at the Santiago Bernabéu Stadium. Sívori wore the number 10 shirt and was appointed the team's captain in 1963, but did not win anymore championships or trophies with Juventus, and left after the 1964–65 season, because of a disagreement with new coach Heriberto Herrera.

With Juventus, Sívori scored 167 goals in 253 appearances in all competitions, making him the club's fifth highest goalscorer ever as of 2011. He also holds the record for most Serie A goals in a single league match; during the 9–1 victory against Inter Milan on 10 June 1961 he scored six goals; this record is jointly shared with Silvio Piola of Pro Vercelli.

Napoli
In 1965, Sívori signed with Napoli, helping them to a third-place finish in the first season at the club; they also won the Coppa delle Alpi. After two successful seasons at the club, Napoli's squad during the 1967–68 season boasted several talents along with Sívori, such as goalkeeper Dino Zoff, and fellow strike partner José Altafini, and were considered one of the favourites to win the league title; the club took A.C. Milan all the way in the battle for the Serie A championship but eventually finished in second place, while Sívori was ruled out for most of the season due to a knee injury and several clashes with manager Bruno Pesaola. Ironically, Sívori's last game for Napoli was against his former club Juventus, in which he was given a red card for kicking Erminio Favalli, and was suspended for six matches. Following his ban, Sívori decided to return to Argentina during the 1968–69 season.

International career

Argentina
At international level, Sívori defended the Argentina national football team eighteen times and registered nine goals. The Argentine side of the time had a formidable attack with Sívori, Oreste Corbatta, Osvaldo Cruz, Humberto Maschio and Antonio Angelillo. The attacking trio of Sívori, Maschio, and Angelillo were nicknamed the caras sucias, which literally means dirty faces in Spanish; in reference to the film of the same name, and due to way they played the game, like fun, dirty faced, mischievous children.

Sívori defended Argentina to the gold medal 1957 South American Championship in Lima, Peru. Argentina dominated in every game during that year's South American Championship; the team's wins throughout the competition included an 8–2 victory against the Colombia national football team, and a 3–0 victory against close rivals Brazil.

Italy
Sívori moved to Italy in 1957, along with his compatriots Maschio and Angelillo. The Argentine football association banned the attacking trio from playing for Argentina, and eliminated them from the 1958 World Cup. Sívori's Italian ancestry enabled him to become an Italian citizen. In April 1961 he made his debut for the Italy national football team. Along with several other foreign-born Italian players, Sívori played for Italy at the 1962 FIFA World Cup in Chile, where they suffered a first-round elimination. He would earn nine caps and score eight goals while playing for Italy.

Playing style

Encyclopædia Britannica has described Sívori's playing style as "audacious and brilliant"; a highly talented footballer, he is considered one of Italy's and Juventus's greatest ever players, as well as one of the best players of his generation. Sívori was a quick, diminutive, highly creative, and technically gifted forward, known for his pace on the ball, who utilised his acceleration, outstanding dribbling skills, flair, and feints to beat opposing defenders; these included turns, flicks, quick changes of direction, and his innovative trademark move: the nutmeg, also known as tunnel, in Italian, which involved him playing the ball between an opponents legs. He was primarily a left footed player, and was an excellent finisher and a prolific goalscorer, who possessed a powerful and accurate shot from both inside and outside the area, and who had the ability to score not only with his left, but also his right foot and, in spite of his short stature, his head; this would sometimes see him receiving kicks to the face. Despite not being particularly strong, due to his slender physique, Sívori was also known for his as tenacity and bravery on the pitch, as well as his professionalism as a footballer, although he also drew criticism at times for his volatile character and unsportsman-like behaviour, which often saw him argue with officials, commit aggressive tackles on his opponents, or attempt "to provoke and to humiliate" other players with his skill on the ball.

Although he was an excellent goalscorer, especially while with Juventus, Sívori was also able to utilise his vision and passing accuracy to create chances for team-mates, working in unison with Charles and Boniperti in the club's attacking trident, and was capable of playing both in the centre as a main striker and in a deeper role as a second striker or inside forward on the left side of the pitch. Because of his creative playing style, skill, eye for goal, country of birth, hairstyle, strong mentality, and at times rebellious nature both on and off the field, Sívori is often retroactively compared to another left–footed Argentine player who emerged after him: Diego Maradona, with some parts of the media dubbing him "the Maradona of the Sixties".

Managerial career

Sívori retired from the playing field in 1969. Although he retired to his native Argentina as a wealthy man, his love for the game meant that he decided to take up a further career as a coach; he coached River Plate, Rosario Central, Estudiantes de La Plata, Racing Club and Vélez Sarsfield. In 1970, Bobby Moore was arrested in Bogota, Colombia after a shop assistant claimed to have seen him steal a bracelet from the shop she was working in. After several days, the charges were quashed, and as Moore took a flight to Mexico, he met Sivori, who told him that the false accusation thing was frequent in Colombia.

From 1972 until 1974, Sívori took charge of the Argentina national team, and the team qualified for the 1974 FIFA World Cup. Sívori was the first man to call up Ubaldo Fillol to defend Argentina. Fillol would become one of the most highly regarded keepers in Argentine history. After that he became a full-time scout in South America for Juventus. In 1983, he was the head coach for Toronto Italia in the National Soccer League.

After retirement
In March 2004, Sívori was named by Pelé as one of the top 125 greatest living footballers and honoured as part of the FIFA 100. The following year in February 2005, Sívori died in his hometown of San Nicolás at the age of 69 due to pancreatic cancer.

Career statistics

Club

International

Scores and results list Argentina's and Italy's goal tally first, score column indicates score after each Sívori goal.

Honours

River Plate
 Primera División: 1955, 1956, 1957

Juventus
 Serie A: 1957–58, 1959–60, 1960–61
 Coppa Italia: 1958–59, 1959–60, 1964–65
Inter-Cities Fairs Cup runner-up: 1964-65
 Coppa delle Alpi: 1963

Napoli
Coppa delle Alpi: 1966

Argentina
 South American Championship: 1957
 Copa Raúl Colombo (friendly): 1956 

Individual
 South American Championship player of the tournament: 1957
 Serie A Golden Boot: 1959–60
 Ballon d'Or: 1961
 FIFA 100: 2004

Filmography
Sívori played the part of himself, in two Italian films.
Idoli controluce – (1965)
The President of Borgorosso Football Club (1970)

Quotes
Giampiero Boniperti: "Playing alongside him was pure fun. Charles was the target man, while Omar used the space to put defenders in trouble. He used to play with socks down around his ankles, without any kind of protection, to show he wasn't scared of defenders. He had an incredible winning mentality."
John Charles: "With Sivori, it was the classic big man-little man partnership. Sivori had huge skill and it was a joy to play with a player as good as he was."
Marcello Lippi: "Whenever we were talking about Juventus, his eyes brightened up."
Humberto Maschio: "He was amazing. A first-class dribbler who had speed and the ability to surprise at any moment."
Roberto Bettega: "He was like an older brother for me. He was my idol when I was a kid and then we became close friends. He was one of the best players in the history of football."

See also
Oriundo

Notes

References

Bibliography

External links

 

1935 births
2005 deaths
People from San Nicolás de los Arroyos
Sportspeople from Buenos Aires Province
Argentine people of Italian descent
Italian people of Argentine descent
Citizens of Italy through descent
Argentine footballers
Italian footballers
Club Atlético River Plate footballers
Juventus F.C. players
S.S.C. Napoli players
Serie A players
Deaths from pancreatic cancer
Ballon d'Or winners
FIFA 100
Argentina international footballers
1962 FIFA World Cup players
Italy international footballers
Argentine football managers
Argentina national football team managers
Club Atlético River Plate managers
Rosario Central managers
Estudiantes de La Plata managers
Racing Club de Avellaneda managers
Club Atlético Vélez Sarsfield managers
Canadian National Soccer League coaches
Dual internationalists (football)
Deaths from cancer in Argentina
Argentine Primera División players
Copa América-winning players
Argentine people of Ligurian descent
Association football forwards